Paulina Schmiedel (born 29 May 1993) is a German swimmer. She competed in the women's 4 × 200 metre freestyle relay event at the 2016 Summer Olympics.

References

External links
 

1993 births
Living people
German female swimmers
Olympic swimmers of Germany
Swimmers at the 2016 Summer Olympics
Place of birth missing (living people)
German female freestyle swimmers
20th-century German women
21st-century German women